William Yun Lee (born March 22, 1971) is an American  actor and martial artist. He is best known for his roles as Danny Woo in the supernatural drama Witchblade and Jae Kim in the sci-fi series Bionic Woman. He has also appeared in the films Die Another Day (2002), Elektra (2005) and The Wolverine (2013). He had a recurring role as Sang Min in Hawaii Five-0, plays the original body of series protagonist Takeshi Kovacs in Altered Carbon, plays Marvelous Man in The Guardians of Justice (2022) and voiced Wei Shen in the game Sleeping Dogs (2012). , he is appearing on the ABC medical drama The Good Doctor playing Dr. Alex Park.

Early life
Lee was born in Arlington, Virginia to Korean parents. His parents are mother Jung Ja Lee and father Soo Woong Lee, a Taekwondo grandmaster.  He first began training at just three years old and spent a portion of his youth teaching at Lee's Tae Kwon Do training facility, his family's business in Napa, California. 

Lee spent his youth moving across the United States and has attended 23 schools.

Lee attended UC Berkeley with a full athletic scholarship to study political science and ethnic studies.

Career
Lee had supporting roles in high-profile films such as Die Another Day, Torque, The King of Fighters and Elektra. He has also acted on FX Network's mini-series Thief and ABC Family's TV movie Mini-series Fallen. He recently guest starred in Hawaii Five-0 as recurring character "Sang Min", and in True Blood as "Mr. Gus". He also played Kenuichio Harada in James Mangold's The Wolverine (2013). In 2018, Lee appeared in several episodes of the Netflix science-fiction series Altered Carbon as the original body of protagonist Takeshi Kovacs (otherwise predominantly played by Joel Kinnaman in season one and Anthony Mackie in season two).

Lee provides the voice of the main protagonist in Square Enix's Hong Kong open-world crime game Sleeping Dogs as undercover cop Wei Shen.

In 2002, he was named by People as one of their "50 Most Beautiful People", which quickly led to high-profile roles. In November 2007, he was again recognized by People, this time as one of the members of their list of the 15 "Sexiest Men Alive".

Lee is among the actors, producers and directors interviewed in the 2006 documentary The Slanted Screen directed by Jeff Adachi, about the representation of Asian and Asian American men in Hollywood. He was featured in the music video of Mariah Carey's "Boy (I Need You)" as well as Ice Cube's "Roll Call".

Personal life
In October 2010, Lee married actress Jennifer Birmingham in Shreveport, Louisiana. Their son, Cash, was born in June 2013. Cash was diagnosed with Moyamoya disease, a rare blood disorder, at the age of three.

Filmography

Film

Television

Video games

References

External links

 
 
 Eichberger, Gaby; Schmidt, Christine (September 2011). "Interview with Will Yun Lee". mycoven.com

1971 births
American male actors of Korean descent
Male actors from Virginia
American male film actors
American male television actors
American male video game actors
American male voice actors
American male taekwondo practitioners
Living people
People from Arlington County, Virginia
University of California, Berkeley alumni
20th-century American male actors
21st-century American male actors